The Karnataka State Film Award for Best Sound Recording was one of the Karnataka State Film Awards awarded for Kannada films. It was first awarded for films of 1968-69 and discontinued after the 2010–11 Awards

Superlative Winners

Award winners
The following is a complete list of award winners and the name of the films for which they won.

See also
 Cinema of Karnataka
 List of Kannada-language films

References

Karnataka State Film Awards
Kannada-language films
1968 establishments in Mysore State